Deyhuk (also Romanized as Deyhūk; also known as Dohak, Dūhak, and Dūhuk) is a city in and capital of Deyhuk District, in Tabas County, South Khorasan Province, Iran. At the 2006 census, its population was 2,767, in 766 families.

References 

Populated places in Tabas County
Cities in South Khorasan Province